Karanganyar is a town in Kebumen Regency, Central Java, Indonesia. According to the Indonesian Agency for Meteorology, Climatology and Geophysics, this area has high rainfall. Its climate is renowned for its coolness.

Administrative villages
Karanganyar consists of 11 villages (kelurahan or desa) namely:
 Candi
 Giripurno
 Grenggeng
 Jatiluhur
 Karanganyar
 Karangkemiri
 Panjatan
 Plarangan
 Pohkumbang
 Sidomulyo
 Wonorejo

References

External links 
  

Districts of Central Java
Kebumen Regency